Kukmin Ilbo is a South Korean daily newspaper published by The Kukmin Ilbo in Seoul, South Korea. In South Korea, "Kukmin" means "nation people". It is headquartered in Yeouido-dong, Yeongdeungpo District, Seoul.

Kukmin Ilbo is officially a media aimed at Christian values. The newspaper is a "centrist" media outlet, but there has been an anti-LGBT controversy, so some reporters inside are insisting on reform of the newspaper's constitution.

History
The newspaper was founded by David Yonggi Cho in 1988.

Controversies
In November 2011, the newspaper's CEO, Cho Hee-jun, was indicted on embezzlement charges and misuse of the newspaper's funds. In February 2014, he was sentenced to 3 years in prison.

References

External links

  
 Official site 
 Official YouTube Channel 
 Official Facebook Page 

Christianity in South Korea
Conservative media in South Korea
Discrimination against LGBT people in South Korea
Newspaper companies of South Korea
Newspapers published in South Korea